Jan Schilt (3 February 1894, Gouda – 9 January 1982, Englewood, New Jersey) was a Dutch-American astronomer, inventor of the Schilt photometer.

Biography
Schilt was born in 1894 in the Netherlands, and educated there under Jacobus Kapteyn. He emigrated to the United States in 1933 as the Chair of Columbia University's astronomy department, a position which he filled until his retirement in 1962, when he was granted the title of Rutherford Professor of Astronomy Emeritus.

Schilt's astronomical work included the invention of the Schilt photometer, a device which measures the light output of stars, and, indirectly, their distances. He worked on the motions of star streams in the Milky Way Galaxy, and was director of the Yale-Columbia Southern Station in Johannesburg and Canberra, as well as Director of the Rutherford Observatory at Columbia.

Schilt was noted at Columbia for walking into his classes the first day after the launch of Sputnik 1 and commenting "Well, gentlemen, it is not every day we have something new in the sky to talk about", following which he devoted the entire class to proving that Sputnik had been deliberately launched into an orbit designed to make it invisible from the United States for as long as possible (six weeks).

13,500 items of his papers are contained in the Rare Book and Manuscript Library of Columbia University.

Honor
Asteroid 2308 Schilt (1967 JM) was named in his honor.

Published works

See also
Ida Barney

References

New York Times obituary, January 11, 1982
Columbia University Library Bulletin

1894 births
1982 deaths
20th-century American astronomers
20th-century Dutch astronomers
Discoverers of asteroids
People from Gouda, South Holland
Utrecht University alumni
University of Groningen alumni
Dutch emigrants to the United States
Columbia University faculty
20th-century American inventors